Denmark High School is a public high school located in Denmark, Wisconsin.

Academics
In spring 2016, Denmark was named to the Advanced Placement honor roll for high schools for their offerings and increase in students passing.

Demographics
Denmark is 93 percent white, four percent Hispanic, one percent all other races, and two percent of students identify as a part of two or more races.

From 2000–2019, high school enrollment declined 13.6%.

Enrollment at Denmark High School, 2000–2019

Athletics
.
The school participates in Division 3 (formerly of Division 2) of the Wisconsin Interscholastic Athletic Association as a member of the Northeastern Conference (Wisconsin).

Denmark's trap shooting team won the 2018 and 2019 state championships. The Denmark boys' spring baseball team lost the D2 state final in 2005 against Kenosha St. Joseph in 12 innings.

The boys' basketball team won the 1985 Division B state final. The team returned to state in 2019, but fell in the state semifinal to Waupun

The softball team won state finals in 1982 (Division B), 1983 (Division B), 1991 (D2), and 1997 (D2).

Extracurricular activities
Denmark High has been noted for a large agriculture presence, especially through FFA.

Notable alumni
Frank Joseph Dewane, current Bishop of Venice in Florida

References

Public high schools in Wisconsin
Schools in Brown County, Wisconsin
Denmark, Wisconsin